Peter Becker may refer to:
Peter Becker (actor) (born 1979), Anglo-German actor
Peter Becker (biologist) (born 1958), German molecular biologist
Peter Becker (curler) (born 1949), New Zealand curler
Peter Emil Becker (1908–2000), German neurologist
Peter Becker (Friends), a fictional character in the American sitcom Friends
Peter Becker (rower) (born 1956), West German rower
Peter Becker, president of the Criterion Collection, an American video-distribution company

See also
Peter Beckers (1947–1996), Scottish professional footballer